Seethadevi Girls' College  is a girls' school in Kandy, Sri Lanka. It is a provincial school funded by the central government providing primary and secondary education. Under-16 Seethadevi Girls' College A team won the Sri Lanka Schools Hockey A division tournament in 2019.

History
The school has started as a primary school in 1980 with 18 girls. M. D. Kamalawathi was the first principal of the girls' college.

Hockey
In 2019, the school's under 16 A team won the Sri Lankan Schools Hockey division A championship beating Holy Family Convent, Wennappuwa in a penalty shootout. Hesendi Ranmali of the school was awarded the best goal keeper's award. The school was the semifinalists and won the 3rd place of Sri Lanka Schools Hockey Association tournament in 2018.

In 2017, A and B teams of the school travel to India to compete in Sub junior National Hockey Championship and won against the home teams.

Past principals

See also
Education in Sri Lanka

References

External links

1980 establishments in Sri Lanka
Educational institutions established in 1980
Girls' schools in Sri Lanka
National schools in Sri Lanka
Provincial schools in Sri Lanka
Schools in Kandy